"Erika" is a marching song used by the German military. The song was composed by Herms Niel in the 1930s, and it soon came into usage by the Wehrmacht, especially the Heer. No other marching song during World War II reached the popularity of "Erika".

Origins
"Erika" is both a common German female name and the German word for heather. The lyrics and melody of the song were written by Herms Niel, a German composer of marches. The exact year of the song's origin is not known; often the date is given as "about 1931", a date that, however, has not been substantiated. The song was originally published in 1938 by the publishing firm Louis Oertel in Großburgwedel. It had been popular prior to the start of World War II. The song encourages hard work, and according to Michael Tillotson, no other marching song during World War II reached the popularity of Erika. It was extensively played at large political events.

Music

The song begins with the line "Auf der Heide blüht ein kleines Blümelein" (On the Heath a Little Flower Blooms), the theme of a flower (Erika) bearing a soldier's sweetheart's name. After each line, and after each time the name "Erika" is sung, there is a three beat pause, which is filled by the kettledrum or stomping feet (e.g. of marching soldiers), shown as (xxx) in the text below.

Lyrics

References

External links
"Erika", lyrics and recordings, ingeb.org

German folk songs
German military marches
German patriotic songs
Songs with music by Herms Niel
Songs about the military
Songs about flowers
1930s songs